Prime Minister Abe may refer to:
Nobuyuki Abe (1875–1953), 25th Prime Minister of Japan
Shinzō Abe (1954–2022), 57th and 63rd Prime Minister of Japan

See also
Abe (surname)